Upper Niumi is one of the six districts of the North Bank Division of the Gambia which is located in West Africa The remaining five districts are: Lower Niumi, Jokadu, Lower Baddibu, Central Baddibu and Upper Baddibu.

See also
Aljamdu

References

 
Districts of the Gambia